Stefan Milenkovich (born January 25, 1977) is a Serbian violinist.

Early life
Milenković was born to a Serbian father, Zoran Milenković, and a Serbian-born mother of Italian descent, Lidija Kajnaco (Lidia Caenazzo). He started playing violin in 1980, at age three, taught by his father and often accompanied by his mother. His first public performance, in 1980, was followed by numerous youthful performances, including the Newport Rhode Island Music Festival and an appearance at a Reagan holiday special when he was ten years old,
 as well as a performance for Mikhail Gorbachev in 1988 and an appearance before Pope John Paul II when he was fourteen.

He participated in numerous international violin competitions, starting with the Jaroslav Kozian International Violin Competition before he was ten. Then, in rapid succession during 1993 and 1994, at age sixteen and seventeen, he took high prizes in ten international violin competitions. In 1993 he took third prize in the Menuhin Competition (England), reached the finalist level at the Queen Elisabeth Competition (Belgium), and won the Rodolfo Lipizer Prize (Italy). He entered the Paganini Competition (Italy) twice and the Tibor Varga Competition (Switzerland) twice, in 1993 and 1994, taking one fourth-place and three second-place prizes. Also in 1994 he took fourth place in the International Joseph Joachim Violin Competition, won the Louis Spohr International Violin Competition (both, Germany), and won Silver at the International Violin Competition of Indianapolis.

Academics 
Milenkovich studied at the Music Academy of Belgrade, receiving his master's degree in 1995. His successes on the competition circuit, along with winning Young Concert Artists status at the 1997 YCA auditions, led to his New York City recital debut at the 92nd Street Y in 1997, and his undertaking studies at the Juilliard School with Dorothy DeLay. He was awarded a violin degree at Juilliard in 1998 and taught in various roles at Juilliard over the next decade in collaboration with Ms. DeLay, in the Perlman Music Program on Shelter Island, and as assistant to Mr. Perlman at the Juilliard School. In 2006 he joined the faculty of the University of Illinois, where he is an Associate Professor in the Instrumental Performance Division of the School of Music. Since 2011 he also teaches on the faculty of the University of Belgrade.

Performances 
Milenkovich has performed extensively as a solo artist, in duets, in a wide variety of other small groups, and as a soloist with orchestra. For example, he recently performed Bach, Paganini, Ysaye and Kreisler solo works at the Hermitage of Santa Caterina del Sasso. He has recorded the Bach solo violin Sonatas and Partitas and the complete solo violin music of Niccolò Paganini

The 92nd Street Y recital in 1997 was one event in a long-running collaboration with pianist Rohan de Silva, for example, a 1999 concert at the Kennedy Center and three concerts in Sri Lanka. A long-term collaboration with pianist Adam Neiman goes back at least as far as 2001. He has also collaborated with pianist Lera Auerbach and pianist Srebrenka Poljak and, working with Massimo Paderni, recorded selected Paganini violin/piano works. Other duo performances include Kenji Bunch's Three American Folk Hymn Settings for Two Violins with Viviane Hagner and a recording of Bunch's Paraphraseology with marimbist Makota Nakura on the Kleo Classics label.

Milenkovich, cellist Ani Aznavoorian and pianist Adam Neiman formed the Corinthian Trio in 1998 while they were students at the Juilliard School and this trio performed extensively for the next decade. The collaboration of Milenkovich and Adam Neiman continues, often with violist Che-Yen (Brian) Chen. For example, these three were joined by cellist Bion Tsang for the opening concert of the 2017 Manchester Music Festival. The Jupiter Symphony Chamber Players series is an important outlet for Milenkovich's performance of chamber music, including a 2006 performance of an octet by Joachim Raff and a 2017 concert which featured Beethoven's second Razumovsky quartet and a Spohr quintet. Milenkovich played lead violin at a concert in the 2010 Naumburg Summer Concert Series, consisting of Bach's D minor keyboard concerto with pianist Stephen Beus, Mendelssohn's E-flat Major Octet, and a cello quintet by Friedrich Dotzauer with cellist David Requiro, a co-winner of the 2008 International Naumburg Competition. Beus, Requiro and Milenkovich continue to collaborate in Jupiter Symphony Chamber Players concerts. Milenkovich, cellist Riccardo Agosti, and violinist Pier Domenico Sommati have recorded selected Paganini chamber works and Milenkovich participated in recording CD #8 in 10-CD set of the complete Paganini chamber music oeuvre. He sometimes dances as he plays the violin, especially in non-classical settings. Milenkovich has played Tango concerts both in Europe and in the United States.

Milenkovich has performed the solo part in the violin concertos of Beethoven,  Bruch (G minor), Dvořák, Mendelssohn (E minor), Sibelius and Tchaikovsky.

In 2020 Milenković started living in Serbia with his family, and he started to work as the director of the Concert hall of the city of Novi Sad.

Instruments 
Milenkovich has performed on the “Lyall” Stradivari violin (1702) and the “Sennhauser” Guarneri del Gesú (1735) on loan from the Stradivari Society. From 2006 until 2017, he performed on a violin by Peter Aznavoorian (Chicago, 2006). Currently, Milenkovich owns and plays a violin by Giovanni Battista Guadagnini (Turin, 1783). He most often uses “Berg” bows by bowmaker Michael Duff of Bloomington, Indiana

Awards
In 2021 he was awarded the Order of Karađorđe's Star.

Discography
Vittorio Giannini: Quintet for Piano and Strings; Trio for Piano and Strings [World Premiere Recordings]
Complete Music for Solo Violin
Paganini: In Cor Piu Non Mi Sento
Bach: Sonatas And Partitas For Solo Violin, Bwv 1001-1006
Paganini Recital
Tango Compass
Stefan Milenkovich Brahms & Glazunov

References

External links
Official website

Serbian classical violinists
Male classical violinists
Serbian violinists
Serbian people of Italian descent
Living people
1977 births
21st-century classical violinists
21st-century male musicians
People from Belgrade
Juilliard School alumni
Serbian expatriates in the United States